The 1928 DePaul Blue Demons football team was an American football team that represented DePaul University as an independent during the 1928 college football season. In its fourth season under head coach Eddie Anderson, the team compiled a 4–4–1 record and was outscored by a total of 117 to 100.

Schedule

References

DePaul
DePaul Blue Demons football seasons
DePaul Blue Demons football